Polešovice is a market town in Uherské Hradiště District in the Zlín Region of the Czech Republic. It has about 2,000 inhabitants.

Geography
The western part lies in the Kyjov Hills, the eastern part lies in the Lower Morava Valley.

History
The first written mention of Polešovice is from 1220, when it was owned by the newly-established Cistercian monastery in Velehrad. The Church of Saints Peter and Paul was first mentioned in 1320, but it was destroyed by the Hussites in 1421. After the Hussite Wars, the church was built again.

Sights
The main sight is the Church of Saints Peter and Paul. It was baroque rebuilt to its current form in 1725–1735.

Notable people
Jaroslav Krejčí (1916–2014), Czech-British sociologist

References

Populated places in Uherské Hradiště District
Market towns in the Czech Republic